Ribeirão Pires (Pires Stream) is a city in the Metropolitan Region of the city of São Paulo, in the state of São Paulo, Brazil. It is part of the "ABC Region." The population is 124,159 (2020 est.) in an area of 99.1 km2. The elevation is 763 m.

Its neighboring cities are Ferraz de Vasconcelos to the north, Suzano to the northeast and east, Rio Grande da Serra to the southeast and south, Santo André southwest, and Mauá northwest. The city is served by trains from Line 10 of CPTM. It became its own municipality in 1953, following its emancipation from Santo André.

Notable people

Willian
Paulo Szot

References

Municipalities in São Paulo (state)